Anisophyllea cinnamomoides is a species of plant in the family Anisophylleaceae. It is endemic to Sri Lanka.

Culture
Known as "වැලි පියන්න - weli piyanna" in Sinhala.

References

 website for botany and other details

Flora of Sri Lanka
cinnamomoides
Vulnerable plants
Taxonomy articles created by Polbot